Tobias Waisapy (born 8 January 1989) is a Dutch former professional footballer who played as a defender.

Career
Born in Capelle aan den IJssel, Waisapy began his career as a youth at Feyenoord, and played senior football for Excelsior. In July 2012 he was linked with Go Ahead Eagles. He later played for XerxesDZB.

Personal life
He is of Indonesian descent.

References

1988 births
Living people
Dutch footballers
Excelsior Rotterdam players
Eredivisie players
People from Capelle aan den IJssel
Association football defenders
Dutch people of Indonesian descent
Feyenoord players
XerxesDZB players
Footballers from South Holland